Hong Kong Economic and Trade Office, Berlin (HKETO Berlin) commenced operation in Berlin, Germany in March 2009.  It is responsible for promoting Hong Kong's economic and trade relations with eight Central European countries, namely Austria, the Czech Republic, Germany, Hungary, Poland, Slovakia, Slovenia and Switzerland. It is located in Jägerstrasse 33, 10117 Berlin, Germany. The Director of the Office is Betty SP Ho, who reports to the Special Representative for HK Econ & Trade Affairs to the European Union, Brussels ETO.

In recognition of the special status of Hong Kong as a Special Administrative Region of the People's Republic of China, and HKETO Berlin, an ordinance was passed in February 2009 by the Bundesrat of the Federal Republic of Germany. The ordinance grants HKETO Berlin the full set of diplomatic privileges and immunities, despite the fact Hong Kong is not a sovereign state.

Before it commenced its operations in Berlin, HKETO Berlin had its temporary office in the office of HKETO Brussels, Belgium.

The official opening of HKETO, Berlin was held on 21 March 2011.

References

External links 
Official site

Berlin
Economy of Berlin
Germany–Hong Kong relations